Ernest Whitman (February 21, 1893 - August 5, 1954) was an American stage and screen actor. He was also billed in some Broadway plays as Ernest R. Whitman.

Early years
Whitman was born in Oklahoma City, Oklahoma, and was educated at Tuskegee Institute. He was ordained as a minister in 1907. His participation in Chautauquas led to his becoming an entertainer in vaudeville.

Career

Whitman debuted as an entertainer in Purcell, Oklahoma. He performed on stage in The Last Mile and other productions. He sang in a touring production of Lucky Sambo (1927).

He appeared in a number of films, including King for a Day (1934), The Prisoner of Shark Island (1936), The Green Pastures (1936), Jesse James (1939), Gone With the Wind (1939), Third Finger, Left Hand (1940), Among the Living (1941), Road to Zanzibar (1941), 
Cabin in the Sky (1943), Stormy Weather (1943), The Lost Weekend (1945), My Brother Talks to Horses (1947), Banjo (1947) and The Sun Shines Bright (1953), his last movie.

On radio, Whitman was the wartime host of the Armed Forces Radio Service's Jubilee, which was designed for African-American troops and featured mostly African-American entertainers. He portrayed the character Awful on The Gibson Family.  He played Bill Jackson on Beulah on radio and on TV.

Death
Whitman died at his home of a liver ailment on August 5, 1954, in Hollywood, aged 61.

Broadway roles

Billed as Ernest Whitman
 The Last Mile (1930) as Vincent Jackson
Chamberlain Brown's Scrap Book (1932) as Ashley the penitent
--Source: Internet Broadway Database

Billed as Ernest R. Whitman
Harlem (1929) as Kid Vamp and in ensemble
Savage Rhythm (1931) as Sweetback
Bloodstream (1932) as Duke Taylor
The Monster (1933) as Caliban
John Brown (1934) as Frederick Douglass
--Source: Internet Broadway Database

Filmography

King for a Day (1934, Short) as Mr. Brown (film debut)
The Prisoner of Shark Island (1936) as 'Buck' Milford
The Green Pastures (1936) as Pharaoh
White Hunter (1936) as Abdi
They Gave Him a Gun (1937) as Roustabout (uncredited)
Nothing Sacred (1937) as Policeman (uncredited)
Daughter of Shanghai (1937) as Sam Blike (uncredited)
Pacific Liner (1939) as Professor - Black Stoker (uncredited)
Jesse James (1939) as Pinkie
Tell No Tales (1939) as Slab Griffin (uncredited)
6,000 Enemies (1939) as Black Prisoner Willie Johnson (uncredited)
Gone With the Wind (1939) as Carpetbagger's Friend (uncredited)
Congo Maisie (1940) as Varnai
Castle on the Hudson (1940) as Alexander '8 Ball' Hamilton (uncredited)
Buck Benny Rides Again (1940) as Colored Gentleman (uncredited)
Safari (1940) as Witch Doctor (uncredited)
Maryland (1940) as Dogface
Mystery Sea Raider (1940) as First Fisherman (uncredited)
The Return of Frank James (1940) as Pinky
Third Finger, Left Hand (1940) as Sam
Santa Fe Trail (1940) as Black Man in Barn (uncredited)
Back Street (1941) as Porter #1 (uncredited)
Road to Zanzibar (1941) as Whiteface
The Get-Away (1941) as 'Moose'
The Pittsburgh Kid (1941) as Feets Johnson
Married Bachelor (1941) as Black Men's Room Attendant (uncredited)
Birth of the Blues (1941) as Fancy-Pants, Doorman (uncredited)
Blues in the Night (1941) as Black Prisoner #1 (uncredited)
Among the Living (1941) as Pompey
Mr. District Attorney in the Carter Case (1941) as Sam (uncredited)
The Bugle Sounds (1942) as Cartaret
Drums of the Congo (1942) as King Malaba
Arabian Nights (1942) as Nubian Slave (uncredited)
The Human Comedy (1943) as Black Man on Train (uncredited)
Cabin in the Sky (1943) as Jim Henry
Stormy Weather (1943) as Jim Europe (uncredited)
The Impostor (1944) as Ekoua
The Adventures of Mark Twain (1944) as Stoker (uncredited)
Goldilocks and the Jivin' Bears (1944, Short) as Narrator (Voice, Uncredited)
Dillinger (1945) as Jack - Black Prisoner (uncredited)
The Lost Weekend (1945) as Black Man Talking to Himself (uncredited)
She Wouldn't Say Yes (1945) as Train Bartender (uncredited)
My Brother Talks to Horses (1947) as Mr. Mordecai
Banjo (1947) as Uncle Jasper
Blonde Savage (1947) as Tonga
 Half-Pint Pygmy (1948, Short) as Pygmy (Voice, Uncredited)
 Beulah (1952, TV) as Bill Jackson
The Sun Shines Bright (1953) as Pleasant 'Uncle Plez' Woodford (final film)

References

External links

1893 births
1954 deaths
American male film actors
American male radio actors
African-American male actors
American male stage actors
American male television actors
People from Fort Smith, Arkansas
Male actors from Arkansas
20th-century American male actors
20th-century African-American people